Loch of Avich is a large freshwater loch that lies approximately  west of Loch Awe in Argyll and Bute in Scotland. It is the second biggest loch in the Etive basin after Loch Awe. It trends east-northeast, west-southwest and is narrowly triangular in shape. At the southwest end of the loch is the islet Innis Luana on which stands the ruins of an ancient castle named Caisteal na Nighinn Ruaidhe (Castle of the Red Haired Maiden). The castle may have been the original seat of Clan Campbell. Near the north shore on the islet of Eilean Fraoch is the remains of a crannog.

Survey
The loch was surveyed on 26 and 27 May 1903 by Sir John Murray, T.N. Johnston, R.B. Young, R.C. Marshall and E.M. Wedderburn and later charted  as part of Murray's Bathymetrical Survey of Fresh-Water Lochs of Scotland 1897-1909.

References

Avich
Avich